This is a list of regencies and cities in Aceh province. As of October 2019, there were 18 regencies and 5 cities.

External links 

 
 
Subdivisions of Indonesia
Regencies, Indonesia
Regencies and cities